The Pljevlja Gymnasium is a secondary school in Pljevlja. Since its founding the gymnasium bears the name of its first principal and professor of history: "Tanasije Pejatović Gymnasium" (Гимназија Танасије Пејатовић/Gimnazija Tanasije Pejatović )

It was established by the Metropolitanate of Karlovci on November 18, 1901. Pljevlja Gymnasium was the first gymnasium in the newly formed Province of Pljevlja founded at Berlin Congress, placed under dual occupation and administered by Austro Hungarians and Ottoman Empire. Following the treaty items of Berlin Congress education in Pljevlja Gymnasium included also Christian youth from Prijepolje and Priboj, the regions within the Province of Pljevlja, and Christian youth from a part of the city of Pljevlja administered by the Austro-Hungarian administration where the school building was located. The teaching staff were Serbs from different places of the region under the Austro Hungarian occupation, as well many professors were sent from Kingdom of Serbia and Principality of Montenegro. Among them was Vasa Stajić and the famous painters Nadezda Petrovic and Milenko Atanacković all of them, at that time,residents 
with documents of Austria-Hungary

Background
The first educational life until beginning of modern education, was organized in Churches and monasteries. The Holy Trinity Monastery (Pljevlja) became of great significance of cultural and spiritual life for the Orthodox Serbs in the Middle Ages.School in 
the monastery of St. Trinity has been working continuously since 16th century. It continues to be of cultural importance. The school in the Holy Trinity Monastery has been in service since the 16th century. The school in the nearby Dovolja monastery 
has been functional since the 18th century. The primary school system was established in this region in 1823.

History

The Pljevlja Gymnasium was established in 1901 as the Serb Gymnasium (Srpska gimnazija/Српска ) with the financial support of the Ministry of Foreign Affairs of the then Kingdom of Serbia. The gymnasium's first principal was Tanasije Pejatović and Jovan Cvijić as supervisor.Instruction was given in Serbian. Subjects included social sciences and natural sciences, history, social geography, physical geography, anthropology and ethnography.

Gymnasium in Kingdom of Montenegro 
After the final liberation of the city during the First Balkan War in October 1912 by Treaty of Bucharest (1913) the territory and school 
become part of the Kingdom of Montenegro

Gymnasium in Kingdom of Yugoslavia 
In Kingdom of Yugoslavia on March 29, 1919, falling under the jurisdiction of the Zeta Banovina province in 1929. In 1944 studies resumed in the gymnasium. On 8 April 1945 it was organized into the Ministry of Education of PR Montenegro. In 1968, the gymnasium was renamed to Tanasije Pejatović Gymnasium.

In 1977, as part of the Stipe Šuvar statewide education reform in Socialist Yugoslavia, the gymnasium was merged into the Vocational education stream, removing many of its advantages over other schools. The principals of all gymnasiums in SR Serbia and SR Montenegro lobbied the scientific and policy-making community to re-establish their special status, rights, funding, and curriculum. As a result, in 1991 the school was officially re-established as a classical gymnasium.

Honours
Order of Merit with the Golden Star, by Presidency of SFR Yugoslavia.
Oktoih Award by Socialist Republic of Montenegro.

References

Literature

Sources
Serbian High School in Pljevlja cultural property of national significance

External links 
Gojko Ružičić prominent Slavic studies philologist at the Pljevaljaska Gymnasium, Ghent University, Columbia University, Charles University in Prague born in Pljevlja

Gymnasiums in Montenegro
Neoclassical architecture in Montenegro
Pljevlja Municipality
Pljevlja
Educational institutions established in 1901
1901 establishments in Montenegro